{{speciesbox
|name = Rough honey-myrtle
|image = Melaleuca scabra (leaves, flowers) 02.JPG
|image_caption = Melaleuca scabra
|genus = Melaleuca
|species = scabra
|authority = R.Br.
|synonyms_ref =
|synonyms =
 Myrtoleucodendron scabrum (R.Br.) Kuntze
 Melaleuca muricata A.Cunn. ex DC.
}}Melaleuca scabra, commonly known as rough honey-myrtle, is a species of shrub that is endemic to a small area on the south coast of Western Australia. It has warty leaves and profuse, pink to purple heads of flowers between July and November.

The flowers are arranged in heads at the ends of branchlets that continue to grow after flowering. The stamens are shades of pink or deep purple with a yellow anther at the tip and are arranged in 5 bundles around the flower, each bundle containing 3 to 6 stamens.

Taxonomy and namingMelaleuca scabra was first formally described in 1812 by Robert Brown in William Aiton's Hortus Kewensis. The specific epithet (scabra) is from the Latin word scaber meaning "rough", "scurfy", "scabby" or "mangy". This melaleuca was formerly assumed to be a widespread species until the genus was revised in 1999 by Lyndley Craven and Brendan Lepschi. 

In Flora Australasica of 1828, Robert Sweet described this species as "a rare and beautiful plant" and "...its flowers are of a dark purple and produced in great abundance; the ends of all the young shoots being covered with them, they are there crowded in dense heads, so that they have scarcely room to expand, and are of a pleasant aromatic scent."''

Distribution and habitat
Rough honeymyrtle occurs in coastal areas of Western Australia between Hopetoun and Israelite Bay in the Esperance Plains and Mallee biogeographic regions growing in soils containing sand, clay or laterite.

Conservation
This melaleuca is classified as "not threatened" by the Government of Western Australia Department of Parks and Wildlife.

References

scabra
Myrtales of Australia
Rosids of Western Australia
Plants described in 1812
Endemic flora of Western Australia
Taxa named by Robert Brown (botanist, born 1773)